Scartelaos is a genus of gobies native to the coasts of the Indian Ocean and the western Pacific Ocean.

Species
There are currently four recognised species in this genus:
 Scartelaos cantoris (F. Day, 1871)
 Scartelaos gigas Y. T. Chu & H. W. Wu, 1963
 Scartelaos histophorus (Valenciennes, 1837) (Walking goby)
 Scartelaos tenuis (F. Day, 1876) (Indian Ocean slender mudskipper)

References

Oxudercinae